
Gmina Miechów is an urban-rural gmina (administrative district) in Miechów County, Lesser Poland Voivodeship, in southern Poland.

Villages
Apart from the town of Miechów, Gmina Miechów contains the villages and settlements of Biskupice, Brzuchania, Bukowska Wola, Celiny Przesławickie, Dziewięcioły, Falniów, Falniów-Wysiołek, Glinica, Jaksice, Kalina Mała, Kalina-Lisiniec, Kalina-Rędziny, Kamieńczyce, Komorów, Nasiechowice, Parkoszowice, Podleśna Wola, Podmiejska Wola, Pojałowice, Poradów, Przesławice, Pstroszyce Drugie, Pstroszyce Pierwsze, Siedliska, Sławice Szlacheckie, Strzeżów Drugi, Strzeżów Pierwszy, Szczepanowice, Widnica, Wielki Dół, Wymysłów, Zagorzyce, Zapustka and Zarogów.

Neighbouring gminas
Gmina Miechów is bordered by the gminas of Charsznica, Gołcza, Książ Wielki, Racławice, Radziemice, Słaboszów and Słomniki.

References
Polish official population figures 2006

Miechow
Miechów County